Jailbreakers is a 1994 television film directed by William Friedkin. Filming took place in Southern California and it was released on September 9, 1994. The film originally aired on Showtime as part of their Rebel Highway series that took the titles of 1950s-era B-movies and applied them to original films. The film was later released on VHS.

Plot
The film takes place in the 1950s. Angel is a 15-year-old cheerleader who has her life all ahead of her. She falls in love with Tony Falcon, a drug dealing high school drop-out. A nighttime outing leads to trouble and Angel and Tony are caught. Although Tony is the only one who is sent to jail, Angel has it very hard as well. She is estranged from her parents and her friends refuse ever to talk to her. The family think it is for the best for them to move to new surroundings.

Angel and her family move to a nice and quiet suburbia. She starts an entire new life and even falls in love with a new boy. However, she is soon in trouble when Tony escapes from jail and interrupts her sweet sixteen. He takes her away from her family and together they try to escape to Mexico. A chase follows, with the police and Angel's father trying to catch Tony.

Cast
Shannen Doherty - Angel Norton
Antonio Sabàto, Jr. - Tony Falcon
Vince Edwards - Mr. Norton
Adrienne Barbeau - Mrs. Norton
Adrien Brody - Skinny
Sean Whalen - Tattoo
Talbert Morton - Whale
Chris Conrad - Jack
Dana Barron - Sue
Johnny La Spada - Gary
Kerri Randles - Missy

References

External links

1994 films
1994 television films
1990s English-language films
1990s teen drama films
Rebel Highway
American teen drama films
Films directed by William Friedkin
Films scored by Hummie Mann
Films set in the 1950s
Films with screenplays by Debra Hill
Films produced by Debra Hill
1994 drama films
American drama television films
1990s American films